Family Guy is an American adult animated sitcom created by Seth MacFarlane for the Fox Broadcasting Company. The series centers on the Griffins, a family consisting of parents Peter and Lois; their children Meg, Chris, and Stewie; and their anthropomorphic pet dog Brian. The show is set in the fictional city of Quahog, Rhode Island, and exhibits much of its humor in the form of cutaway gags that often lampoon American culture. Along with its core voice actors, episodes make frequent use of guest stars.

Guest stars who have lent their voices to the show come from a wide range of occupations including musicians, actors, athletes, politicians and more. Some have only made a single appearance, while others, like James Woods, have gone on to become recurring fan favorites. Over the years, the show has become notable for featuring stars reprising their famous roles in animated form. In the episode "Lois Comes Out of Her Shell", for example, Johnny Depp reprised his iconic role as Edward Scissorhands. On the other hand, episodes have also given guests the opportunity to play caricatures of themselves, like "Not All Dogs Go to Heaven" which featured the main cast of Star Trek: The Next Generation, including Patrick Stewart, Jonathan Frakes, Brent Spiner, LeVar Burton, Gates McFadden, Michael Dorn, Wil Wheaton, Marina Sirtis, and even Denise Crosby (season 1 as Tasha Yar), playing themselves headed to a Star Trek convention.

Season 1

Season 2

Season 3

Season 4

Season 5

Season 6

Season 7

Season 8

Season 9

Season 10

Season 11

Season 12

Season 13

Season 14

Season 15

Season 16

Season 17

Season 18

See also

References

External links
 

Guest Stars
Family Guy